Narrabundah College is a government college that teaches the last two years of secondary education in the Australian Capital Territory (ACT). It was the first school in Australia to offer the International Baccalaureate (IB), starting the programme in February 1978.

History
Narrabundah College was formed as a result of the ACT developing its own education system in 1974. The new system meant that public high schools would only teach from year 7 to 10, and that years 11 and 12 would be completed at a separate school. The pre-existing Narrabundah High School was re-formed as Narrabundah College.

Due to low enrolments, the ACT Schools' Authority threatened to close the school in 1978. This prompted the community into seeking backing for the IB programme. The then-federal Minister for Education, John Carrick, approved the commencement of the programme in 1979, ensuring the survival of the school.

Campus

The college campus is located in the suburb of Narrabundah, Canberra. It consists of several buildings including the large "S Block" which was originally the segregated senior building for years 11 and 12 prior to the school becoming a secondary college. In addition to a quadrangle and a canteen, the college also has a gymnasium and a theatre, as well as spacious playing fields on which students may spend their free time and is close to golf courses, public ovals and the local shops.

The College facilities also feature smart boards, iPads, and computer and science labs. Every student is supplied a laptop computer for personal and educational use according to ACT legislation.

Block B, Block C, and Block D were contaminated with friable crocidolite asbestos. As such, the ACT Government  employed Robson Environmental to undertake regular inspections to ensure the safety of staff and students. Furthermore,  the affected buildings were demolished after the 2018 school year, and are to be replaced with modern educational facilities. Transportable classrooms were installed in the college during session 2 of 2018.

Curriculum
Narrabundah College offers a wide range of courses, and is highly regarded in the field of languages. As well as ESL and TIS (Translating and Interpreting Skills), the college offers students the opportunity to study the following languages:

 Chinese
 French
 German
 Hindi
 Indonesian
 Italian
 Japanese 
 Korean
 Spanish

Hindi was taken off of the curriculum during the 2018 school year, but was reintroduced by the 2019 enrolment period.

Indonesian was scheduled to be removed from the curriculum in 2019 due to low interest; however, due to a student-organised petition for the school to continue teaching the language, the college has continued to offer Indonesian as a class.

Student assessments
For students to be awarded a Year 12 Certificate on the completion of Year 12, they must complete a total of 17 or 18 units (if undertaking IB) from College courses including either 3 majors and 3 minors, 4 majors and 1 minor, or 5 majors. Courses offered by the College are assessed based on how students perform during assignments, essays, tests, "lab-pracs", workshop projects, and creative works depending on what is appropriate for the course area.

Each course offered by the College is designated tertiary (T), vocational (V), or accredited (A). Students completing A units are awarded an A to E grade based on performance for each course criteria, students completing V units are designated as 'competent' (C) or 'not yet competent' (NYC), and students completing T units will receive an A to E grade as well as a score to indicate a rank compared to other students in the same course. Students who fail to complete the minimum requirements for assessments will "void" the unit, and do not have that unit count towards the completion of their course.

Today

In 2006, 918 students were enrolled at Narrabundah College, which had a capacity of 912 students. 86% of college-aged students in the college's priority enrolment area attend Narrabundah, yet over half of students enrolled in the school do not live in the priority enrolment area.

In 2007, Narrabundah College was the best performing government-run college in the ACT, with a higher average University Admission Index (before the introduction of the Australian Tertiary Admission Rank) and a greater number of students achieving a UAI of 65 or over than any other state college.  Narrabundah students also made a high proportion of those achieving in the top one percent of the state, with 18 students achieving a UAI of over 99. In addition to this, Narrabundah College also awarded more Tertiary Entrance Statements, and more Year 12 Certificates than any other college in the ACT.

A very high percentage of Narrabundah College students who graduate with a Year 12 Certificate also obtain a ATAR and go on to study at university. In 2017, the median ATAR gained by students of Narrabundah College was 83.7 compared with the average of students from all across ACT colleges of 77. 86.75% of students from the college who were awarded Tertiary Education Statements in 2017 scored over 65 for their ATAR, while 144 students attained an ATAR above 90, and 86 students received a score above 95.

Notable alumni
The following people are notable former students who attended Narrabundah College:

Tim Ferguson, comedian, television presenter and member of the Doug Anthony All Stars
Patricia Piccinini, artist
Helen Razer, writer
Ben Snow, special effects artist 
Bill Stefaniak, Liberal Party politician
Timomatic, musician and dancer
Greg Walker, multi-instrumentalist (as Machine Translations), producer, composer

Sister schools 
Hangzhou Foreign Language School

References

External links
Narrabundah College official website
Annual ACT Government Schools Report 2006: Narrabundundah College
Narrabundah College 86, 87 & 88 reunion website

High schools in the Australian Capital Territory
Public schools in the Australian Capital Territory
International Baccalaureate schools in Australia